In chemistry, the square antiprismatic molecular geometry describes the shape of compounds where eight atoms, groups of atoms, or ligands are arranged around a central atom, defining the vertices of a square antiprism. This shape has D4d symmetry and is one of the three common shapes for octacoordinate transition metal complexes, along with the dodecahedron and the bicapped trigonal prism.

Like with other high coordination numbers, eight-coordinate compounds are often distorted from idealized geometries, as illustrated by the structure of Na3TaF8.  In this case, with the small Na+ ions, lattice forces are strong.  With the diatomic cation NO+, the lattice forces are weaker, such as in (NO)2XeF8, which crystallizes with a more idealized square antiprismatic geometry.

Examples

References

Stereochemistry
Molecular geometry